Kimberly Seelbrede is a former beauty queen from Ohio who held the title Miss USA 1981. Seelbrede is a licensed psychotherapist in the states of New York and New Mexico. Seelbrede holds a graduate degree from New York University.
Following the pageant, Seelbrede embarked on a career in television, commercials and print modeling.

Biography
Seelbrede, who hails from Germantown, Ohio won the Miss Ohio USA pageant in late 1980.  She represented her state at the nationally televised 1981 Miss USA pageant that was held in Biloxi, Mississippi in May 1981, where she became the second woman from Ohio to win the Miss USA title.

Seelbrede later competed at the Miss Universe pageant held in New York City in July 1981. Seelbrede placed in the semi-finals at the pageant, which was won by Irene Saez of Venezuela.

Notes

External links
Kim Seelbrede professional website
Miss Ohio USA official website
Miss USA official website

1960s births
Life coaches
Living people
Miss Universe 1981 contestants
Miss USA winners
New York University alumni
People from Germantown, Ohio
Psychotherapists